George Melville may refer to:

 George W. Melville (1841–1912), engineer, Arctic explorer and author
 George Melville, 1st Earl of Melville (1636–1707), Scots aristocrat, statesman, and member of the Melville family
George Melville (bushranger) (c.1822–1853), criminal in Colonial Victoria
George Melville-Jackson  (1919–2009), Royal Air Force officer
George Whyte-Melville (1821–1878), Scottish novelist